Lactocollybia is a genus of agaric fungi in the family Marasmiaceae. The widespread genus contains 17 species, many of which are found in tropical areas.

Species

See also

List of Marasmiaceae genera

References

External links

Marasmiaceae
Agaricales genera
Taxa named by Rolf Singer